Ronhuberia is a genus of beetles in the family Cicindelidae, containing the following species:

 Ronhuberia eurytarsipennis (W. Horn, 1905)
 Ronhuberia fernandezi (Cassola, 2000)

References

Cicindelidae